Blagoveshchenskoye is a rural locality (a selo) and the administrative center of Blagoveshchenskoye Rural Settlement of Velsky District, Arkhangelsk Oblast, Russia. The population was 1,086 as of 2014. There are 12 streets.

Geography 
Blagoveshchenskoye is located on the Ustya River, 62 km northeast of Velsk (the district's administrative centre) by road. Plovskaya is the nearest rural locality.

References 

Rural localities in Velsky District